Ulmus americana var. floridana, the Florida elm, first described as Ulmus floridana by Alvan Wentworth Chapman in the 1860s, is smaller than the type, and occurs naturally in north and central Florida south to Lake Okeechobee.

Description
The
leaves, to 6 in long, are dark green all summer and turn yellow in autumn.

Pests and diseases
The tree is no less susceptible to Dutch elm disease, although the disease is less prevalent in Florida.

Cultivation
Occasionally planted as a shade and ornamental tree in Florida.

Accessions
The IRREC Garden, University of Florida. Accession details not available.

References

External links
Harvard University Herbaria, specimen 0034307 Sheet labelled U. americana var. floridana; Chapman's Chipola River specimen, Florida; 1860
Herbarium of the Archbold Biological Station, vplants.org specimen ARCH04148 Sheet labelled U. americana var. floridana; Venus, Highlands County, Florida, 1949
Herbarium of Florida State University, Tallahassee; specimen TTRS_000009461 Sheet labelled U. americana var. floridana (juvenile leaves); Otter Creek, Levy County, Florida, 1976
 

Ulmus
Ulmus articles missing images
Elm species and varieties